Liudmila Sergeyevna Vorontsova (born 22 February 1999) is a Russian boxer.

She won a medal at the 2019 AIBA Women's World Boxing Championships.

References

1999 births
Living people
AIBA Women's World Boxing Championships medalists
Russian women boxers
Featherweight boxers
Olympic boxers of Russia
Boxers at the 2020 Summer Olympics
Sportspeople from Buryatia